

Codes

References

T